Qiasi (also Romanized as Qīāsī; also known as Ghiyas, Kiās, Qayās, Qeyās Bālā, Qīās, and Qīās-e Bālā) is a village in Qarah Quyun-e Jonubi Rural District, Qarah Quyun District, Showt County, West Azerbaijan Province, Iran. At the 2006 census, its population was 256, in 47 families.

References 

Populated places in Showt County